"Trouble with the Natives" is a science fiction short story by British writer Arthur C. Clarke, first published in 1951. This comic story describes the pains of aliens visiting an English village, as every effort at contact with humans gets frustrated. The story was also published as "The Men in the Flying Saucer".

This story has similarities with Clarke's other short stories "History Lesson" and "Rescue Party": in all three pieces, aliens draw naive and humorous conclusions about humans from little information.

External links 
 

Short stories by Arthur C. Clarke
1951 short stories